Strength Thru Oi! is a 1981 Oi! compilation album, featuring various artists and released by Decca Records, released in collaboration with Sounds magazine.

The album was the sequel to Oi! The Album (1980), and itself was followed by Carry On Oi! (Oi 3!, 1981) and Oi! Oi! That's Yer Lot! (Oi/4, 1982).

Track listing
 "National Service" - Garry Johnson
 "1984" - 4 Skins
 "Gang Warfare" - The Strike
 "Riot Riot" - Infa-Riot
 "Dead End Yobs" - Garry Johnson
 "Working Class Kids" - The Last Resort
 "Blood on the Streets" - Criminal Class
 "She Goes to Fino's" - The Toy Dolls
 "Best Years of Our Lives" - Barney Rubble
 "Taken for a Ride" - Cock Sparrer
 "We Outnumber You" - Infa-Riot
 "The New Face of Rock'n'Roll" - Garry Johnson
 "Beans" - Barney Rubble
 "We're Pathetique" - Splodge
 "Sorry" - 4 Skins
 "Running Riot" - Cock Sparrer
 "Johnny Barden" - The Last Resort
 "Isubaleene (Part 2)" - Splodge
 "Running Away" - Criminal Class
 "Skinhead" - The Strike
 "Deidre's a Slag" - The Toy Dolls
 "Harbour Mafia Mantra" - The Shaven Heads

Controversy
When Strength Thru Oi! was released, it was controversial because its title was alleged to be a play on a Nazi slogan ("Strength Through Joy"), and the cover featured Nicky Crane, a British Movement activist who was serving a four-year sentence for racist violence. Rock critic Garry Bushell, who was responsible for compiling the album, said its title was a pun on The Skids' EP Strength Through Joy and that, as an active anti-fascist in the 1970s, he had been unaware of the Nazi connotations. He also denied knowing the identity of the skinhead on the album's cover until it was exposed by the Daily Mail two months later. The intended cover model was bodybuilder Carlton Leach but the pictures, taken at the Bridge House pub in Canning Town, East London, weren't good enough. A cover drawn up by the record label showing a young skinhead from above with the title on his head was rejected. The Crane image was taken from a Christmas card pinned to a wall in the Sounds office.

It was not so easy to deny the album cover's glorification of violence and the sinister tone of its sleeve notes: "A mass of boots, straights, and combat jackets, skins and boot boys, grins and hoots and oy-oy's, young blood on the prowl.... Getting nicked for wearing steel caps, a flick blade flashing in the moonlight." However, this was meant to reflect the reality of the lives of the British working class, as opposed to glorifying the violence faced by them.

See also
 Oi! The Album
 Carry On Oi!
 Oi! Oi! That's Yer Lot!

References

Oi! albums
Decca Records compilation albums
Race-related controversies in music
1981 compilation albums
Punk rock compilation albums